NSW Institute of Sport was an Australian UCI Continental cycling team founded in 2017 and disbanded at the end of the same year.

Team roster

References

Cycling teams based in Australia
UCI Continental Teams (Oceania)
Cycling teams established in 2017
2017 establishments in Australia
Defunct cycling teams based in Australia